The following list of tallest buildings in Hangzhou ranks skyscrapers of Hangzhou, Zhejiang by height. The tallest building in Hangzhou is Hangzhou Centre Tower A currently and is 292.8 meters tall. Most skyscrapers in Hangzhou are clustered around the Qianjiang New City and Qianjiang Century City.

Tallest buildings
This lists ranks Hangzhou skyscrapers that stand at least 180 m (590 feet) tall, based on standard height measurement. This includes spires and architectural details but does not include antenna masts. Buildings that have already topped out are also included.

{{row numbers|

Under construction
This lists buildings that are under construction in Hangzhou with at least 200m (656 feet) in height.

References

Hangzhou
Hangzhou-related lists